The Basilica of Saint Pius X, informally known as the Underground Basilica, is a large Roman Catholic church and minor basilica, located in the town of Lourdes, France. It is part of the Sanctuary of Our Lady of Lourdes. Lourdes is a major Catholic pilgrimage site and the Catholic Church endorses the belief that the Virgin Mary appeared to Saint Bernadette Soubirous there.

The Basilica of St. Pius X is the largest and most controversial of the Domain's churches. It was completed in 1958 in anticipation of the enormous crowds expected in Lourdes for the centenary of the Apparitions. The controversy of this church consists of the fact that it is a modern, concrete building, and it is almost entirely underground (part of the building lies beneath the Boulevard Père Rémi Sempé above).

Dimensions and capacity
The Basilica was designed by the architect Pierre Vago. When full it can accommodate up to 25,000 worshippers.

Interior decoration

On the walls there are 52 images in the gemmail style of overlapping stained glass.  On the west ramp are the 15 traditional Mysteries of the Rosary, and on the east ramp are the Stations of the Cross, designed by Denys de Solère. On the lower part of the east side is the series "Bernadette's Way of Light", based on sketches by René Margotton, which depict the eighteen apparitions  together with two scenes from her life. There are two further images, one on each side of the entrance to the sacristy.

Consecration
The consecration of the basilica was on March 25, 1958 by Angelo Cardinal Roncalli, who was earlier the Papal Nuncio to France, then Patriarch of Venezia, and who later became Pope John XXIII. The consecration year was selected to celebrate the centenary of the 18 visions of the Virgin Mary by Saint Bernadette. This basilica is one of the largest churches inspired by Visions of Jesus and Mary.

References

External links

Basilica of St. Pius X
The organ of the basilica

Catholic Church in France
Our Lady of Lourdes
Basilica churches in France
Churches in Hautes-Pyrénées